Robert George Arns (1933–2019), was an American experimental physicist working in nuclear and particle physics, and also an historian of physics, technology, and electrical history.

Arns was a professor and for eight years vice president of academic affairs (provost) at the University of Vermont.  He was a principal in the management consulting firm Arns & Green, Inc.  He was also an accomplished painter, specializing most recently in works inspired by images from the Hubble Space Telescope. He had a Ph.D. from the University of Michigan.

Notable works

 R. G. Arns, "The other transistor: early history of the metal-oxide-semiconductor field-effect transistor," Engineering Science and Education Journal, 7, No. 5 (October, 1998): 233-240
 R. G. Arns, "The High-Vacuum X-ray Tube: Technological Change in Social Context," Technology and Culture, 38, No. 4 (October, 1997):852-90

Notes

References
 Robert Arns Awarded IEEE Prize 1998 IEEE Life Members' Prize in Electrical History

External links
 home page

Living people
21st-century American physicists
University of Michigan alumni
University of Vermont faculty
American historians of science
21st-century American historians
21st-century American male writers
American male non-fiction writers
1933 births